Memorial High School is a public high school in Campbell, Ohio, United States. It is the only high school in the Campbell City School District. Athletic teams compete as the Campbell Red Devils in the Ohio High School Athletic Association as a member of the All-American Conference.

OHSAA State Championships

 Boys Baseball - 1993 
 Boys Basketball – 1993 

School Nickname: Red Devils

Notable alumni

 Bob Babich, former NFL player
 Larry Carwell, former NFL player
 Andy Cvercko, former NFL player
 Jack Cvercko, former college All-American
 Sloko Gill, former NFL player
 Ralph Goldston, former NFL player

External links
 District Website

Notes and references

High schools in Mahoning County, Ohio
Public high schools in Ohio